A constitutional referendum was held in Chile on 30 July 1989. The proposed changes to the constitution were approved by 87.7% of voters.

Background
If approved, 54 constitutional reforms were to be implemented, among which the reform of the way that the Constitution itself could be reformed, the restriction of state of emergency dispositions, the affirmation of political pluralism, the strengthening of constitutional rights as well as of the democratic principle and participation to the political life.

The only parties to advocate a "No" vote were the right-wing Party of the South and the Chilean Socialist Party (not to be confused with the Socialist Party of Chile).

Results

By region

Aftermath
Following the approval of the constitutional amendments, general elections were held in December. Patricio Aylwin was elected President with 55% of the vote, whilst the Concert of Parties for Democracy won a majority of elected seats in both chambers of the National Congress.

Pinochet left office on 11 March 1990, transferring power to the new democratically elected president.

References

Constitutional referendums in Chile
July 1989 events in South America
Military dictatorship of Chile (1973–1990)
Referendum
1989 referendums
1989